Harla Kingdom was a 6th century Harla state centered around what is present day eastern Ethiopia. The kingdom had trading relations with the Ayyubid and Tang dynasties. It also established its own currency and calendar. The kingdom is mentioned in Ethiopian accounts during the reign of Emperor Amda Seyon in the fourteenth century. According to researcher Dominico Patassini, Harla kingdom was succeeded by Harar city-state in the sixteenth century.

Recent excavations indicated consumption of wild pigs were prevalent in Harla as opposed to in neighboring Kingdom of Aksum. The excavations were done by the Institute of Arab and Islamic Studies of the University of Exeter as part of the Becoming Muslim project at the urban sites of Harlaa in 2017-2019, Harar in 2014-2018, and Ganda Harla 2014, located in the eastern part of Ethiopia. Substantial assemblages of faunal remains were recovered over the seasons.

The Harlaa archaeological site is located 40 km north-west of Harar and 15 km southeast of Dire Dawa and is the ‘Harla’ stone-built towns and funerary monuments whose origins are ascribed by the Oromo people to a legendary ancient race of giants who occupied the region before the Oromo arrived in the area. Harlaa was a large urban centre covering an area of around 500m east to west and 900m north to south excluding outlying cemeteries. It was composed of several elements including a central settlement area, workshops, three early mosques, wells, lengths of fortification wall, and cemeteries to the north, east, and west. Harlaa predates both Harar and Ganda Harlaa and provided the longest chronology with dates spanning between the mid-6th and early 15th century. 

The Harar site is situated in the Harar Plateau in a more heavily vegetated landscape, having an area of 1000×800m,  and at its core the historic city of Harar which is surrounded by a wall and is accessed by five gates. The excavations indicated that occupation in Harar postdated the 15th century and that the city and its mosques were linked with the establishment of Harar as the capital of the Sultanate of Adal. 

The Ganda Harla is an abandoned settlement located 12.5 km southeast of Harar on a hill west of the village of Sofi and is linked with the Harla in local tradition. The zooarchaeological data indicated the inhabitants were hunters of wild animals in open terrain and scrub hillsides with the exception of Kobus kob which are more commonly found at lower elevations such as in valleys and riverine grasslands. The locals also kept domesticated animals such cattle (Bos taurus/indicus), goat (Capra hircus), sheep, and transport livestock such as donkey, horse and camel. The excavations also uncovered significant evidence for manufacturing and participation in regional and international Red Sea and western Indian Ocean trade networks. The study concluded the inhabitants use of heavy knives and carcass dismemberment showed they had cultural commonalities with the Islamic world of Arabia, Anatolia, Mesopotamia, Levant, and Iberia despite the lack of butchery discussions in zooarchaeological literature from the Islamic world and their non-observance of Islamic dietary laws.

References

Former monarchies of Africa
Countries in medieval Africa
History of Ethiopia